
This is a list of aircraft in alphabetical order beginning with 'S'.

Sh

Shaanxi
(Shaanxi Baojii Special Vehicles - China)

 Shaanxi Y-8
 Shaanxi Y-9
 Shaanxi KJ-500
 Shaanxi Y-8W	
 Shaanxi Y-8J AEW	
 Shaanxi Y-8 AWACS
 Shaanxi ZDK-03 AEW&C

Shamrock 
(Irish Aircraft Co, Sandusky, Ohio, United States)
 Shamrock 3-B
 Shamrock IAC Special

Shanghai
(China)
 Feilong-1
 Shanghai Y-10

Shannon-Buente 
(James Shannon & Ben E Buente, Evansville, Illinois, United States)
 Shannon-Buente Special

Shapley
 Shapley Kittiwake

Shark.Aero 
(Shark.Aero s.r.o.)
 Shark.Aero Shark
 Shark.Aero Shark LS
 Shark.Aero Shark UL
 Shark.Aero SportShark

Sharp 
(George E and Loran Sharp, Newhall, California, United States)
 Sharp Meteora

Sharp
(Jon Sharp)
 Sharp Nemesis
 Sharp Nemesis NXT

Sharpe 
(Graydn L. Sharpe)
 Sharpe SA-1

Shavrov
(Soviet Union)
 Shavrov Sh-1
 Shavrov Sh-2
 Shavrov Sh-3
 Shavrov Sh-5
 Shavrov Sh-7

Shaw 
()
 Shaw Comet

SHBP
(Victor Simonet et al.)
 SHBP monoplane

Shcherbakov 
 Shcherbakov Shche-2

Shchetinin 
 Shchetinin M-9
 ShCh M-9
 Shchetinin M-11

Sheehan 
(Wilfred J Sheehan, S Walpole, Maryland, United States)
 Sheehan Parasol

Sheffield 
 Sheffield Skeeter X-1

Shelton 
(Thomas Shelton (aircraft constructor))
 Shelton Flying Wing

Shenyang
(Shenyang Aircraft Corporation)
 Feilong-1
 Shen Hang-1 Harbin Aviation Polytechnic School<ref name=Gordonp253>{{cite book |last=Gordon |first=Yefim |title=Chinese Aircraft:Chinas aviation industry since 1951 |url=https://archive.org/details/chineseaircraftc1951gord |url-access=limited |year=2008 |publisher=Hikoki Publications |location=Manchester |isbn=978-1-902109-04-6 |author2=Dmitry Komissarov|page=253}}</ref>
 Hong Zhuan-503 Red Special 红专-503
 Shenyang BA-5
 Shenyang X-9 Jian Fan
 Shenyang HU-1 Seagull
 Shenyang HU-2 Petrel
 Shenyang Type56
 Shenyang J-2 (Soviet production MiG-15bis aircraft)
 Shenyang J-5
 Shenyang J-6
 Shenyang J-8
 Shenyang J-8II
 Shenyang J-10 (1st use – 1970's project)
 Shenyang J-11
 Shenyang J-13
 Shenyang J-15
 Shenyang J-16
 Shenyang J-21
 Shenyang JJ-1
 Shenyang JJ-2 (Chinese built MiG-15UTI aircraft)
 Shenyang JJ-5
 Dongfeng-101
 Shenyang F60

 Shenyang/Chengdu 
(China)
 Shenyang/Chengdu J-5

Shenyang Light Aircraft Co.
(China)
 HU-1

 Shepard-Krum 
(Fred J Shepard & Thomas C Krum, Beaverton OR.)
 Shepard-Krum SC-1 Sportcraft

 Shepherd 
(F R Shepherd, Riverbank, California, United States)
 Shepherd Skylark

 Sheremetyev 
(Boris Nikolayevich Sheremetyev)
 Sheremetyev ShBM
 Sheremetyev Sh-13

 Sherpa Aircraft Manufacturing 
(Sherpa Aircraft Co Inc, Aloha, Oregon, United States. Sherpa Worldwide Inc & Sherpa International Inc.)
 Sherpa Aircraft Sherpa
 Sherpa Aircraft Sherpa 8
 Sherpa Aircraft Sherpa 200
 Sherpa Aircraft Sherpa 300
 Sherpa Aircraft Sherpa 400
 Sherpa Aircraft Sherpa 411
 Sherpa Aircraft Sherpa 500

 Shigeno 
(Kiyotake Shigeno)
 Shigeno Wakadori-go

 Shijiazhuang 
(Shijiazhuang Aircraft Industry Co.)
 Shijiazhuang Y-5
 Shijiazhuang LE-500 Little Eagle 
 Shijiazhuang LE-800
 Shijiazhuang HO300 Seagull
 Shijiazhuang Qingting 5
 Shijiazhuang Qingting 5A
 Shijiazhuang Qingting 5B
 Shijiazhuang Qingting 6

 Shin Meiwa/ShinMaywa  
(Japan)
 Shin Meiwa UF-XS technology demonstrator
 Shin Meiwa KJT-1
 Shin Meiwa Tawron
 Shin Meiwa PS-1
 Shin Meiwa US-1
 ShinMaywa US-2

 Shinn 
((Clifford) Shinn Engr Co, Santa Ana, California)
 Shinn 2150

 Shirato 
(Shirato Hikoki Kenkyusho'' – Shirato Aeroplane Research Studio)
 Shirato Asahi-go
 Shirato Anzani (Ground Taxi-ing) Trainer
 Shirato Iwao-go
 Shirato Takeru-go (aka Tamura Tractor or Ichimori Tractor)
 Shirato Kauru-go
 Shirato 16
 Shirato 20
 Shirato 25 Kuma-go
 Shirato 26
 Shirato 28
 Shirato 31
 Shirato 32
 Shirato 37
 Shirato 38
 Shirato 40

Shirlen 
(Roy L Shirlen, Winston-Salem, North Carolina, United States)
 Shirlen Big Cootie

Shneider 
(Fred  P.  Shneider, 1020 E 178 St, New York, United States)
 Shneider I
 Shneider II
 Shneider 1910 Curtiss pusher

Shober 
(William C Shober, Brookeville, Maryland. c.1973: Shober Aircraft Enterprises, Gaithersburg, Maryland, United States)
 Shober Willie II

Shores 
(Boyd J Shores, Pasadena, California, United States)
 Shores S-1

Short Brothers 
(United Kingdom)
 Short Admiralty Type 74
 Short Admiralty Type 81
 Short Admiralty Type 42
 Short S.81 (1913)
 Short Type 135 (1914)
 Short Type 136 (1914)
 Short Admiralty Type 166
 Short Admiralty Type 184
 Short Type 310
 Short Type 320
 Short Admiralty Type 827
 Short Admiralty Type 830
 Short Biplane No. 1 (1909)
 Short Biplane No. 2 (1909)
 Short Biplane No. 3 (1910)
 Short Bomber
 Short Folder (1913 ff, generic name applied to several types)
 Short Sporting Type (1919)
 Short Tandem Twin
 Short Triple Tractor (S.47)
 Short N.1B Shirl
 Short N.2A Scout
 Short N.2B
 Short N.3 Cromarty
 Short S.27 (construction number)
 Short Improved S.27 (construction number)
 Short S.34 (construction number) ( Dual-control Improved S.27)
 Short S.36 Tractor Biplane (construction number)
 Short S.34 T1 (construction number)
 Short S.38 (1911)  (construction number of an Improved S.27, later rebuilt to become new type prototype)
 Short S.39 Triple Twin (construction number)
 Short S.41 Tractor Biplane (construction number)
 Short S.42 monoplane
 Short S.45 T5 (construction number)
 Short S.46 (construction number)
 Short S.47 T4 (construction number)
 Short S.53 Admiralty Type 42 (construction number)
 Short S.54 (construction number)
 Short S.57 (1912) (construction number)
 Short S.60 (construction number)
 Short S.63 Folder Seaplane (construction number)
 Short S.69 (construction number)
 Short S.80 (construction number)
 Short S.81 Gunbus Seaplane (construction number)
 Short S.82 (construction number)
 Short S.87 Type 135 Seaplane (construction number)
 Short S.135 (construction number)
 Short S.301 (140 hp Salmson) Seaplane (construction number)
 Short S.1 Cockle
 Short S.2 (Metal hull for F.5)
 Short S.3 Springbok I 19 April 1923
 Short S.3a Springbok II 25 March 1925
 Short S.3b Chamois
 Short S.4 Satellite
 Short S.5 Singapore I
 Short S.6 Sturgeon
 Short S.7 Mussel
 Short S.8 Calcutta
 Short S.8/8 Rangoon
 Short S.10 Gurnard
 Short S.11 Valetta
 Short S.14 Sarafand
 Short-Kawanishi S.15 KF1
 Short S.16 Scion/Scion II
 Short L.17 Scylla
 Short S.17 Kent
 Short S.18 "Knuckleduster" (also known as Short R.24/31)
 Short S.19 Singapore III
 Short S.20 "Mercury"
 Short S.21 "Maia"
 Short S.22 Scion Senior
 Short Mayo Composite
 Short S.23 Empire C-Class
 Short S.25 Sandringham
 Short S.25 Sunderland
 Short S.26 G-Class
 Short S.29 Stirling
 Short S.30 Empire C-Class
 Short S.31 – Half-scale Stirling
 Short S.32
 Short S.33 Empire C-Class
 Short S.35 Shetland Specification R.14/40
 Short S.36
 Short S.41
 Short S.45 Seaford
 Short S.45 Solent
 Short S.312 Tucano
 Short SA.1 Sturgeon
 Short SA.4 Sperrin
 Short SA.6 Sealand
 Short SB.1
 Short SB.2 Sealand II
 Short SB.3
 Short SB.4 Sherpa
 Short SB.5
 Short SB.6 Seamew
 Short SB.7 Sealand III
 Short SC.1
 Short SC.5 Belfast
 Short SC.7 Skyvan
 Short SD.3-30
 Short 330
 Short 360
 Short C-23 Sherpa
 Short Crusader
 Gnosspelius Gull (1923)
 Short Silver Streak (1920)
 Short Sporting Type
 Short FJX

Showa 
 Showa L2D

Showers 
(Showers-Aero)
 Showers Skytwister Choppy

Shriver 
(Tod Shriver & (?) Dietz, Mineola, New York, United States)
 Shriver 1910 Biplane

References

Further reading

External links

 List Of Aircraft (S)

de:Liste von Flugzeugtypen/N–S
fr:Liste des aéronefs (N-S)
nl:Lijst van vliegtuigtypes (N-S)
pt:Anexo:Lista de aviões (N-S)
ru:Список самолётов (N-S)
sv:Lista över flygplan/N-S
vi:Danh sách máy bay (N-S)